Kasia Cerekwicka (born Katarzyna Cerekwicka 17 March 1980 in Koszalin, Poland) is a Polish pop singer. She has been singing since she was a little girl. In 1997, at the age of 17, she won the popular Polish show Szansa na sukces ("Chance for Success").

Career
She has recorded four albums. The first was Mozaika from 2000. In 2007 Kasia admitted she does not like Mozaika and is not surprised that it wasn't popular in Poland. Her next album was Feniks ("Fenix"). In 2006 participated with Her song "Na kolana" ("On your Knees") in the Piosenka dla Europy 2006 to the Eurovision Song Contest 2006 in which she ended 1st in a draw with Ich Troje but according to rules the group was sent to represent Poland due to higher televoting score and they ended 11th in the semi-final, but for Kasia, her song became a hit of the year in Poland and some other parts of Europe. "Ostatnia Szansa" ("Last Chance") was her second single from Feniks reaching No. 1 on MTV Poland. She released "Potrafię kochać" ("I can love") as her third single.

Kasia Cerekwicka's second album Feniks catapulted her career to superstar status. While her two big hits "Na Kolana" and "Potrafię kochać" were hummed throughout Poland, her studio album quickly achieved prestigious platinum status. She won the Superjedynka Award for the Record of The Year and 2006 Opole Festival and next won the Karlshamn Baltic Festival 2006 award in Sweden on 22 July with her song "Na Kolana".

She took part in Taniec z Gwiazdami (Dancing with the Stars) on TVN, placing 4th place (episode 7) out of ten stars. Her latest single "S.O.S" gained popularity on all radio stations and was a candidate to represent Poland in the Sopot International Song Festival 2007 but did not win.

On 8 October 2007 Cerekwicka released her third new album Pokój 203 ("Room 203"). The second single (after "S.O.S.") was a song called "Zostań" ("Stay").

She's called a "Polish Mariah Carey".

Kasia decided to participate again in the Sopot International Song Festival 2008 with the song "Nie Ma Nic" and just obtained a 4th place in the competition.

After having various No. 1 videos on MTV Poland, she was nominated to Best Polish Act in the MTV Europe Music Awards 2008 alongside Afromental, Hey, Ania Dabrowska but they lost to Feel which proceed to the next round for choosing Best European Act.

From March to May 2015, she took part in the third season of Polish TV programme Twoja twarz brzmi znajomo, where she came sixth. There, among others, she perform as Mariah Carey, Michael Bolton, Annie Lennox from Eurythmics, Lauryn Hill from The Fugees or Adele.

Discography

Studio albums

Music videos

References

External links

 www.kasiacerekwicka.com.pl

1980 births
Living people
People from Koszalin
Polish pop singers
Polish R&B singers
Polish soul singers
21st-century Polish singers
21st-century Polish women singers